Peter Fleming and John McEnroe were the defending champions but they competed with different partners that year, Fleming with Gary Donnelly and McEnroe with his brother Patrick.

Donnelly and Fleming lost in the first round to Brad Drewett and Wally Masur, as did the McEnroes to Brad Pearce and Jim Pugh.

There was no result for the tournament due to rain. The final would have seen Paul Annacone and Christo van Rensburg take on Ken Flach and Robert Seguso.

Seeds
Champion seeds are indicated in bold text while text in italics indicates the round in which those seeds were eliminated.

Draw

Final

Top half

Bottom half

External links
 1987 Volvo International Doubles Draw

Doubles